Naqe'e Al Zabib ( – raisin infusion) is a Yemeni raisin beverage. Naqe'e Al Zabib is served fresh, and as the name implies (zabīb means "raisins") it is made of grapes. It is similar to nabidh, an infusion that is made mildly alcoholic from the fermentation of sugars and was consumed widely in the pre-Islamic age. As alcohol (khamr) is considered haram in Islam, both nabidh and naqe'e al zabib are fermented for a certain time before it is converted to alcohol.

Raisins have high levels of vitamin C and other anti-oxidants, are important sources of phosphorus, potassium, calcium, magnesium, iron and copper, and help to prevent tooth decay. To prepare the infusion the raisins are thoroughly washed, covered in hot water, and then left to soak for three hours before being pressed through a sieve to extract the juice. Other recipes recommend boiling the raisins and/or soaking the raisins in the refrigerator overnight before squeezing out the juice. Sometimes the raisins are boiled a second time after the overnight soaking.

References

Yemeni cuisine